CBS 4 or CBS4 may refer to:

Airports
 CBS4, the airport identifier code for Mule Creek Airport in British Columbia, Canada

Television stations in the United States

O&O stations
KCNC-TV, Denver, Colorado
WBZ-TV, Boston, Massachusetts
WCCO-TV, Minneapolis, Minnesota
WFOR-TV, Miami, Florida

Affiliate stations
 KDBC-TV, El Paso, Texas
 KMOV, St. Louis, Missouri
 KPIC, Roseburg, Oregon
Re-broadcast of KVAL-TV in Eugene, Oregon
 KVEO-DT2, Brownsville, Texas (cable channel; broadcasts on channel 23.2)
 KXLF-TV, Butte, Montana
 KXJB-LD, Fargo, North Dakota (cable channel; broadcasts on channel 30)
 WCBI-TV, Columbus, Mississippi
 WGFL, Gainesville, Florida (cable channel; broadcasts on channel 28)
 WHBF-TV, Rock Island, Illinois
 WIVB-TV, Buffalo, New York
 WTTV,  Indianapolis, Indiana (licensed to Bloomington)
 WTVY (TV), Dothan, Alabama
 WWL-TV, New Orleans, Louisiana

Formerly affiliated
 KBST-TV/KEDY-TV/KWAB-TV (now KCWO), Big Spring, Texas (1956 to 1969)
 Was a satellite of KDUB-TV (now KLBK-TV) in Lubbock, Texas (1956−1961)and KPAR-TV (now KTXS-TV) in Sweetwater, Texas (1961−1969)
 KDFW, Dallas/Fort Worth, Texas (1949 to 1995)
 KGBT-TV, Harlingen, Texas (1953 to 2020)
 KXJB-TV (now KRDK-TV), Fargo / Valley City, North Dakota (1954 to 2014)
 KXLY-TV, Spokane, Washington (1953 to 1976)
 WJXT, Jacksonville, Florida (1949 to 2002)
 WOAY-TV, Oak Hill, West Virginia (1959 to 1967)
 WTVJ, Miami, Florida (1949 to 1989)